The 2004 Continental Cup of Curling was held in Medicine Hat, Alberta from November 25 to 28. North America won its second title, defeating Team Europe 228-172.

Teams

Europe
 Sebastian Stock, Daniel Herberg, Stephan Knoll, Patrick Hoffman; EC Oberstdorf
 David Murdoch, Craig Wilson, Neil Murdoch, Euan Byers; Lockerbie CC
 Peja Lindholm, Tomas Nordin, Magnus Swartling, Peter Narup; Östersunds CK
 Dordi Nordby, Linn Githmark, Marianne Haslum, Camilla Holth; Snarøen CC
 Anette Norberg, Eva Lund, Cathrine Lindahl, Anna Bergström; Härnösands CK
 Luzia Ebnöther, Carmen Küng, Yvonne Schlunegger, Laurence Bidaud; CC Bern

North America
 Mark Dacey, Bruce Lohnes, Rob Harris, Andrew Gibson; Mayflower CC
 David Nedohin, Randy Ferbey, Scott Pfeifer, Marcel Rocque; Avonair CC
 Jason Larway, Doug Pottinger, Joel Larway, Bill Todhunter; Granite CC (Seattle)
 Colleen Jones, Kim Kelly, Mary-Anne Arsenault, Nancy Delahunt; Mayflower CC
 Marie-France Larouche, Karo Gagnon, Anne Lemay, Veronique Grégoire; Etchemin CC, St-Romauld, Victoria CC Patti Lank, Erika Brown, Nicole Joraanstad, Natalie Nicholson; Madison CCMixed doubles
(Each game worth six points)

Europe (Murdoch/Githmark) 10-5 North America (Jones/Lohnes)
North America (Larway/Brown) 11-4 Europe (Lindholm/Lund)
North America (Nedohin/Gagnon) 6-5 Europe (Stock/Ebnöther)
North America (Dacey/Kelly) 9-4 Europe (Wilson/Nordby)
Europe (Herberg/Küng) 7-7 North America (Pottinger/Larouche) (each team gets 3 points)
Europe (Nordin/Norberg) 8-3 North America (Ferbey/Lank)

North America wins 21-15

Women's team
(Each game worth six points)

North America (Jones) 4-3 Europe (Nordby)
Europe (Norberg) 6-4 North America (Lank)
Europe (Ebnöther) 10-3 North America (Larouche)
North America (Larouche) 9-4 Europe (Nordby)
Europe (Norberg) 8-2 North America (Jones)
North America (Lank) 6-5 (Ebnöther)

Tie 18-18

Men's team
(Each game worth six points)

Europe (Lindholm) 5-5 North America (Dacey) (each team gets 3 points)
Europe (Stock) 5-4 North America (Larway)
North America (Ferbey) 5-3 Europe (Murdoch)
North America (Dacey) 6-5 Europe (Stock) 
North America (Ferbey) 7-6 Europe (Lindholm)
North America (Larway) 5-3 Europe (Murdoch)

North America wins 27-9

Singles
(Each game worth four points, eight bonus points awarded to top aggregate score)

Küng (Europe) 14-12 Larouche (North America)
Jones (North America) 13-12 Bergström (Europe)
Lank (North America) 20-15 Haslum (Europe)
Larway (North America) 19-13 Narup (Europe)
Ferbey (North America) 21-17 Murdoch (Europe)
Dacey (North America) 17-15 Stock (Europe)

North America wins 28-4

Women's skins
(Each skin is worth one point)

Europe (Nordby) 17-13 North America (Larouche)
Europe (Ebnöther) 24-16 North America (Lank)
Europe (Norberg) 41-19 North America (Jones)

Europe wins 82-48

Men's skins
(Each skin is worth one point)

Europe (Murdoch) 21-9 North America (Larway)
North America (Dacey) 30-10 Europe (Stock)
North America (Ferbey) 47-13 Europe (Lindholm)

North America wins 86-44North America wins aggregate 228-172''

References 

C
Continental Cup of Curling
Sport in Medicine Hat
2004 in Canadian curling
Curling competitions in Alberta
2004 in Alberta